Modesto is a village in Macoupin County, Illinois, United States. The population was 182 at the 2020 census, down from 252 in 2000.

Geography
Modesto is located in northern Macoupin County at  (39.476855, -89.982813). Illinois Route 111 passes through the village as Main Street, leading north  to Waverly and south  to Palmyra.

The village drains east to an unnamed tributary of Nassa Creek, a southwest-flowing feeder of the Macoupin Creek watershed leading west to the Illinois River.

Demographics

As of the census of 2000, there were 252 people, 102 households, and 74 families residing in the village. The racial makeup of the village was 100.00% White.

There were 102 households, out of which 37.3% had children under the age of 18 living with them, 54.9% were married couples living together, 11.8% had a female householder with no husband present, and 26.5% were non-families. 25.5% of all households were made up of individuals, and 18.6% had someone living alone who was 65 years of age or older. The average household size was 2.47 and the average family size was 2.91.

In the village, the population was spread out, with 27.4% under the age of 18, 7.9% from 18 to 24, 25.0% from 25 to 44, 18.3% from 45 to 64, and 21.4% who were 65 years of age or older. The median age was 39 years. For every 100 females, there were 98.4 males. For every 100 females age 18 and over, there were 90.6 males.

The median income for a household in the village was $33,393, and the median income for a family was $37,917. Males had a median income of $31,023 versus $25,000 for females. The per capita income for the village was $14,356. About 10.0% of families and 12.4% of the population were below the poverty line, including 14.3% of those under the age of eighteen and 7.5% of those 65 or over.

References

Villages in Macoupin County, Illinois
Villages in Illinois